"Just Let It Go" is a song recorded by English singer Shakila Karim. It was released on 4 July 2011.

Background and composition
"Just Let It Go" is the debut sing by Shakila Karim. The song was written by Karim's father, Karim Ullah, and recorded at High Barn music studios in Great Bardfield, Essex.

References

External links

2011 singles
2011 songs
Electronic songs
Shakila Karim songs